John C. Mongan (April 17, 1925 – June 20, 2013) was an American politician who was the mayor of Manchester, New Hampshire from 1962 until 1963, and again from 1968 until 1969.  He was a Republican.

Early life and career
Mongan was born in Manchester, New Hampshire to John and Anne (Frain) Mongan on April 17, 1925.  In his youth, he attended Manchester's Main Street School, where he could view strikes taking place at the Amoskeag Manufacturing Company during the Great Depression.

He received a Bachelor of Science from Boston University in 1950.  He went on to achieve a Master of Public Administration from Northeastern University. He died at age 88 in Manchester.

References

 

1925 births
2013 deaths
Mayors of Manchester, New Hampshire
Boston University alumni
Northeastern University alumni
New Hampshire Republicans